The 2018 World Judo Juniors Championships was held between 17 and 21 September 2018 at the Imperial Ballroom in Nassau, The Bahamas. The final day of competition featured a mixed team event, won by team Japan.

Medalists
Source:

Men

Women

Medal table

References

External links
 

 U21
World Championships, Junior
World Junior
World Judo Junior Championships